Litu Anam is a Bangladeshi stage, television and film actor. Thakurgaon is his birthplace. He made his acting debut by performing a drama 'Dure Kothau'. He has acted about 3 thousand dramas and few films. His married life is started with Hridi Haque, the daughter of Dr. Enamul Haque and his wife Lucky Enam. Hridi Haque became the mother of twin baby at The Square Hospital in Dhaka on 2013.

Acting life

The acting life of Litu Anam started from his childhood when he had been rewarded the first prize for performing at his school, the drama 'Chhuti' of Rabindranath Tagore. Having much interest in acting, he established a Theater team in Thakurgaon. Next, in 1989 he joined to Dhaka Theater and after two years in 1991, he performed a stage drama 'Bhut', directed by the film actor Humayun Faridi. For outstanding performance, he had been praised much. In 1998, by performing as an actor with actress Shomi Kaiser in a drama 'Dure Kothau' which was directed by Mohon Khan, Litu Anam had been inaugurated as a dramatic actor in television. After getting admiration from the audience, he acted many dramas, telefilm, and film like Ringo's telefilm 'Shopno', Ahmed Yusuf Saber's 'Tini Ekjon', Bipul Rayhan's 'Bonoful', Lucky Enam's 'Apod', Ferdous Hasan Rana's 'Kanamachhi', 'Bibor', 'Sompurno Rongin', 'Shewla', Hridi Haq's 'Amader Anondo Bari', 'Sei Sob Dingulo', '1971', Sazzad Hossain Dodul's 'Lalghuri', 'Mukhosh', 'Jal o Khorer Putul' etc.

Dramas 

 Megh Baloker Golpo
 Meghdut
 Setar
 Lalghuri
 Mukhos
 Jal o Khorer Putul
 Valobasa
 Valobasi
 Godai Dactar
 Jadur Kathi
 Doirotho
 Chacha Even Company
 World Cup
 Kul Ny Kinar Ny
 Baba
 Opohoron
 Mojar Manus
 Kanamachi
 Dhong
 Chhaymukh
 Korbani Online
 Sagor Songome
 Nolok
 Monvasi
 Prottasa o Prapti
 Bibor
 Shekor
 Ek Je Chhilo Hati
 Je Fule Gondho Nei
 Tumi Nou
 Babuder Futani
 Jua
 Bonnyar Chokhe Jol
 Vitore Bahire
 Rikter Bedon
 Sit Khali Ny
 Korban Ali O Korbani
 Chokhachokhi
 Dohon
 Bogurar Sir
 Nosto Jibon
 Mayajal
 Ojana
 Atonko
 Sopno 1997
 Bijone Sujon
 Lov
 Sesh Drisswe Khoma
 Amader Anondo Bari
 Sei Sob Dingulo
 Icecream
 Horof
 1971 & etc.

Telefilms acted by Litu Anam 

 Shopno
 Telelove
 Porinoti
 Tini Ekjon

Films acted by Litu Anam 

 Nondito Noroke
 Nirontor (2006)
 Adhiar
 Ekattorer Jishu
 Chor o Bhogoban

Social activities

Litu Anam organized the 'L.A. Health Aid' to support the people in Bangladesh who are infected by cancer. The activities of this aid has been started from Thakurgaon.

References

External links
 

Living people
People from Thakurgaon District
Bangladeshi male film actors
Bangladeshi male stage actors
Bangladeshi male television actors
University of Dhaka alumni
Year of birth missing (living people)